Customer analytics is a process by which data from customer behavior is used to help make key business decisions via market segmentation and predictive analytics. This information is used by businesses for direct marketing, site selection, and customer relationship management. Marketing provides services in order to satisfy customers. With that in mind, the productive system is considered from its beginning at the production level, to the end of the cycle at the consumer. Customer analytics plays an important role in the prediction of customer behavior.

Uses
RetailAlthough until recently over 90% of retailers had limited visibility on their customers, with increasing investments in loyalty programs, customer tracking solutions and market research, this industry started increasing use of customer analytics in decisions ranging from product, promotion, price and distribution management. The most obvious use of customer analytics in retail today is the development of personalized communications and offers and/or different marketing programs by segment. Additional reasons set forth by Bain & Co. include: prioritizing product development efforts, designing distribution strategies and determining product pricing. Demographic, lifestyle, preference, loyalty data, behavior, shopper value and predictive behavior data points are key to the success of customer analytics.

Retail managementCompanies can use data about customers to restructure retail management. This restructuring using data often occurs in dynamic scheduling and worker evaluations. Through dynamic scheduling, companies optimize staffing through predictive scheduling software based on predictive customer traffic.  Worker schedules can be adjusted in response to updated forecasts at short notice.   Customer analytics allows retail companies to evaluate workers by comparing daily sales to daily traffic in a store.  The use of customer analytics data affecting the management of retail workers in a phenomenon known as refractive surveillance. The model of refractive surveillance describes how the collection of information on one group can affect and allow for the control of an entirely different group.

Criticisms of useAs retail technologies become more data driven, use of customer analytics use has raised criticisms specifically in how they affect the retail worker. Data driven staffing algorithms can lead to irregular working schedules because they can change on short notice to adapt to predicted traffic. Data driven assessment of sales can also be misleading as daily traffic counters do not accurately distinguish between customers and staff and cannot accurately account for workers’ breaks.

FinanceBanks, insurance companies and pension funds make use of customer analytics in understanding customer lifetime value, identifying below-zero customers which are estimated to be around 30% of customer base, increasing cross-sales, managing customer attrition as well as migrating customers to lower cost channels in a targeted manner.
CommunityMunicipalities utilize customer analytics in an effort to lure retailers to their cities. Using psychographic variables, communities can be segmented based on attributes like personality, values, interests, and lifestyle. Using this information, communities can approach retailers that match their community’s profile.
Customer relationship managementAnalytical Customer Relationship Management, commonly abbreviated as CRM, enables measurement of and prediction from customer data to provide a 360° view of the client.

Predicting customer behavior
Forecasting buying habits and lifestyle preferences is a process of data mining and analysis. This information consists of many aspects like credit card purchases, magazine subscriptions, loyalty card membership, surveys, and voter registration. Using these categories, consumer profiles can be created for any organization’s most profitable customers. When many of these potential customers are aggregated in a single area it indicates a fertile location for the business to situate. Using a drive time analysis, it is also possible to predict how far a given customer will drive to a particular location. Combining these sources of information, a dollar value can be placed on each household within a trade area detailing the likelihood that household will be worth to a company. Through customer analytics, companies can make decisions based on facts and objective data.

Data mining
There are two types of categories of data mining. Predictive models use previous customer interactions to predict future events while segmentation techniques are used to place customers with similar behaviors and attributes into distinct groups. This grouping can help marketers to optimize their campaign management and targeting processes.

Retail uses 

In retail, companies can keep detailed records of every transaction made allowing them to better understand customer behavior in store. Data mining can be practically applied through performing basket analysis, sales forecasting, database marketing, and merchandising planning and allocation. Basket analysis can show what items are commonly bought together. Sales forecasting shows time based patterns that can predict when a customer is most likely to buy a specific kind of item. Database marketing uses customer profile for effective promotions. Merchandising planning and allocation uses data to allow retailers to examine store patterns in locations that are demographically similar to improve planning and allocation as well as create store layouts.

See also

 Buyer decision processes
 Business analytics
 Customer interaction tracker
 Customer intelligence
 Data warehouse
 Psychographics
 Market research
 Mattersight Corporation
 Customer privacy
 Customer data management

References

Further reading
 Kioumarsi, H., Khorshidi, K.J., Yahaya, Z.S., Van Cutsem, I., Zarafat, M., Rahman, W.A. (2009). Customer Satisfaction: The Case of Fresh Meat Eating Quality Preferences and the USDA Yield Grade Standard. Int’l Journal of Arts & Sciences (IJAS) Conference.

External links
 Wharton Customer Analytics Initiative

Marketing analytics
Analytics
Business intelligence terms
Applied data mining
Market research